Venugopala Soraba (29 November 1937 – 29 March 1995) was an Indian poet and writer in Kannada and in English. He authored five novels in Kannada and several collections of poems in Kannada and English. His first major literary work was a collection of poems called Musuku Nasuku.

Works
His works include:
Musuku Nasuku
Dhaare
Hoo Higgu
Bayalaagada Jana
 Jeeva Jeevanta
Two Children and the Singing Bird (English)

See also
 Vellala Sathyam

References

1937 births
1995 deaths
Kannada poets
Kannada-language writers
Poets from Karnataka
Indian male poets
People from Bangalore Rural district
20th-century Indian poets
20th-century Indian male writers